The Public Transport Commission (PTC) was an agency of the Government of New South Wales responsible for the provision of rail, bus and ferry services in New South Wales, Australia from October 1972 until June 1980.

Upon dissolution, responsibility for rail services transferred to the State Rail Authority and responsibility for bus and ferry services to the Urban Transit Authority.

The PTC, composed of five Commissioners appointed by the Governor of New South Wales, was accountable to the Minister for Transport.

Structure

The Act facilitated the merger of the Department of Railways and the Department of Government Transport, the latter being the agency that operated government bus services in Sydney and Newcastle. In December 1974, the  dissolved the Sydney Harbour Transport Board and ferries were added to PTC's responsibility. This coincided with government also taking over the Port Jackson & Manly Steamship Company ferries.

Management
The Public Transport Commission consisted of five commissioners appointed by the Governor of New South Wales, two of whom were nominated by the Minister for Transport. Two of the Commissioners were full-time one of these was appointed by the Governor as Chief Commissioner. The Commission acquired the assets and liabilities of the former commissioners, were bound by current agreements or contracts, and were responsible for the completion of business commenced by them.

The first Chief Commissioner of the PTC was Philip Shirley, a former chairman of Cunard, who came out of retirement to take up the position. Shirley had been involved with the Beeching cuts being vice chairman of the British Railways Board in his native United Kingdom in the 1960s. His cost-cutting approach was criticised by sections of the public, trade unions and the parliamentary opposition. Shirley retired in 1975, two years before his commission was due to conclude. His successor, until the PTC was disbanded in 1980, was Alan Reiher. Upon the dissolution of the PTC, Reiher became chairman of VicRail.

Chief Commissioners

Deputy Chief Commissioners

Commissioners

Activities

A mandarin blue and riviera white livery was introduced on buses, suburban electric trains and ferries while freight wagons were painted in a teal blue livery. From November 1976, trains reverted to Tuscan red while ferries would revert to their Tuscan and green liveries in the 1980s. In November 1979, a modified livery for locomotives was introduced with the colours on the Tuscan and yellow painted ends reverted.The original logo had the letters NSW with arrows pointing east and west. It was replaced in 1975 by the L7 logo. It would continue to be used, albeit with different colours, on buses and ferries until 1989 and on trains until 2010.

In June 1974, the PTC took over the operation of Bowden's Bus Service route 79 from the Town Hall to Tamarama. In September 1975, the PTC began operating Denning coaches out of Dubbo when the Far West Express was replaced.

While best remembered as an era of cutbacks, investment was made during the tenure of the Public Transport Commission with the following ordered:
 312 Leyland Leopard buses
 750 Mercedes-Benz O305 buses
 359 Comeng built S set double deck suburban carriages
 150 A Goninan & Co built S set double deck suburban carriages
 30 V set double deck interurban carriages
 10 FAM sleeper carriages
 30 80 class diesel locomotives
 10 85 class electric locomotives
 various modern bulk freight wagons
 More than 1,000 RACE containers suitable for the Australia standard pallets
 2 Lady class ferries (Street & Herron)

Publication
The PTC published an in-house journal, Transport News, with the first edition published in November 1972.

See also
Railways in Sydney
Rail transport in New South Wales
Timeline of Sydney Harbour ferries

References

Bus companies of New South Wales
Defunct government entities of New South Wales
Ferry companies of New South Wales
Railway companies of New South Wales
Transport in New South Wales
Transport companies established in 1972
Transport companies disestablished in 1980
1972 establishments in Australia
1980 disestablishments in Australia